The Premier Handball League is the highest level of men's club handball in England. It is organised by the England Handball Association.

History
The Premier Handball League was formerly known as the Super 8, and was re-branded for the 2017/18 season
 Data sources: 1972-2019; 1975-1976 Wirral Handball Club Clubs and Honours; 1977-1982 Midlands Handball Association (1982) Handball Directory. page 12.; 1983 British Handball Association Word is ... No.5 page 3;

Format
The league consists of 8 teams which play each other twice in a season, once at each club's home venue. 3 points are awarded for each win, 2 points for a draw, and 1 point for a loss.
Should the situation occur that two or more clubs finish with the same number of
points, their final positions shall be determined by (and in the following order):
a. goal difference;
b. taking into account the results of the headtohead Super 8 matches between the
clubs concerned;
c. goals scored;
d. further matches played at a neutral venue.

The team finishing bottom of the Men's Premier Handball League (8th Place) will be relegated directly to their nearest Championship League (North or South). Following the final matches of the Championship, a series of playoff matches will take place to determine the club which will be promoted to the following season's Super 8. 
The top 2 clubs from each Championship league will play 2 semifinals as follows:
North 1 v South 2
South 1 v North 2.
The winners of the above semifinals will then play one match to determine the
promotion spot.

European competitions
The Premier Handball League contributes teams to European Handball Federation club competitions.
The England Handball Association is awarded places in European competition based on its EHF coefficient rank. Currently the Premier Handball League provides 1 team to the EHF Cup and 3 teams to the EHF Challenge Cup.

See also
List of handball clubs in England

References

Handball in England
Sports leagues established in 2012
2012 establishments in England
Professional sports leagues in the United Kingdom
Handball competitions in the United Kingdom